The men's javelin throw event at the 1999 European Athletics U23 Championships was held in Göteborg, Sweden, at Ullevi on 31 July 1999.

Medalists

Results

Final
31 July

Participation
According to an unofficial count, 14 athletes from 9 countries participated in the event.

 (2)
 (1)
 (1)
 (3)
 (3)
 (1)
 (1)
 (1)
 (1)

References

Javelin throw
Javelin throw at the European Athletics U23 Championships